Henry Lerolle (3 October 1848 – 22 April 1929) was a French painter, art collector and patron, born in Paris. He studied at Académie Suisse and in the studio of Louis Lamothe.

His work was exhibited at the Paris Salon in 1868, 1885, and 1895. In 1889 Lerolle painted the murals The Crowning of Science and The Teaching of Science in the Hôtel de Ville, Paris. He painted Flight into Egypt in the Sorbonne, and also did works in Schola Cantorum (the establishment of which he was involved), and the church of St. Martin des Champs, both in Paris. Lerolle was made a Chevalier, Légion d'honneur in 1889.

Lerolle's paintings are in the collections of the Metropolitan Museum of Art, the Museum of Fine Arts, Boston, the Musée d'Orsay and the Fine Arts Museum of San Francisco.

Patronage

Lerolle owned several canvases by Maurice Denis including Catholic Mystery, and is considered to be Denis's first important patron. In fact, Denis claimed that Lerolle "discovered him."  In 1892 Lerolle commissioned Denis to paint a ceiling mural for his home entitled "L'Echelle dans le Feuillage" ("Ladder in the Foliage"). Additionally, Lerolle was a friend and patron to Degas and Renoir, the latter of whom painted several portraits of Lerolle's daughters and of Lerolle himself. Lerolle also owned works by  Fantin-Latour (who painted Lerolle's wife, Madeleine Escudier),  Corot, Gauguin, and others.

Madame Lerolle's sister, Jeanne, was married to the composer Ernest Chausson and the Lerolle home, at 20, avenue Duquesne  was a meeting place  not only for artists, but also musicians of the day including Vincent d'Indy, Claude Debussy and Paul Dukas. Having met via Lerolle, Chausson also commissioned works by Maurice Denis. Lerolle was also a violinist and composer.

Debussy dedicated several piano works to Lerolle's daughter Yvonne (b. 1877) including three Images in 1894.  Yvonne Lerolle was a friend to Julie Manet, daughter of the painter Berthe Morisot.

See also
Les Nabis

Notes

References
Groom, Gloria Lynn, Nicholas Watkins, Jennifer Paoletti, and Therese Barruel. Beyond the Easel: Decorative Paintings by Bonnard, Vuillard, Denis, and Roussel, 1890-1930. Chicago: Art Institute of Chicago, 2000.
Kellogg, D. O., T. Spencer Baynes, and W. Robertson Smith. The Encyclopædia Britannica; Latest Edition. A Dictionary of Arts, Sciences and General Literature. New York: Werner, 1902.
Manet, Julie, Rosalind de Boland Roberts, and Jane Roberts. Growing Up with the Impressionists: The Diary of Julie Manet. London: Sotheby's Publications, 1987.
"Henry Lerolle." The Concise Grove Dictionary of Art. Oxford University Press, Inc., 2002.

External links to works by Lerolle

The Organ Rehearsal at The Metropolitan Museum of Art.
By the Riverside at Museum of Fine Arts, Boston
  Portrait of the Artist's Mother at Musée d'Orsay 
Après le bain at Musée d'Orsay 

1848 births
1929 deaths
Burials at Montparnasse Cemetery
University of Paris people
19th-century French painters
French male painters
20th-century French painters
20th-century French male artists
Painters from Paris
French art collectors
Chevaliers of the Légion d'honneur
19th-century French male artists